Euodice is a genus of small seed-eating birds in the family Estrildidae. These species are from the dry zones of Africa and India and are commonly referred to as silverbills. They were formerly included in the genus Lonchura.

The grey-headed silverbill, which shares the name "silverbill", is a member of the same family but is placed in the genus Spermestes.

Taxonomy
The genus Euodice was introduced in 1862 by the German naturalist Ludwig Reichenbach. The name combines the Ancient Greek eu meaning "good" with ōdikos meaning "musical" or "singing". The type species was designated as the African silverbill in 1890 by Richard Bowdler Sharpe.

The Indian and Africa silverbills were formerly placed in the genus Lonchura. A molecular phylogenetic study published in 2020 found that these species formed a clade that was basal to the members of Lonchura.

Species
The genus contains two species:

References

 
Bird genera
Estrildidae
Taxa named by Ludwig Reichenbach